Senate Square, formerly known as Decembrists' Square (Площадь Декабристов) from the 1920s to 2008, and (formally) as Peter's Square (Петровская площадь), from 1782 to 1925, is a city square in Saint Petersburg, Russia.  It is situated on the left bank of the Bolshaya Neva, in front of Saint Isaac's Cathedral. In 1925 it was renamed Decembrists' Square to commemorate the Decembrist Revolt, which took place there in December 1825.

The square is bounded by the Admiralty building to the east. On the west is the Senate Building and the Synod Building (now headquarters of the Constitutional Court of Russia). The Bronze Horseman monument, a statue honoring Peter the Great, has stood in the square since 1782 - whence the official name of "Peter's Square". On July 29, 2008, the square reverted to the name "Senate Square".

See also
 List of squares in Saint Petersburg

Notes

References 

 

Squares in Saint Petersburg
Tourist attractions in Saint Petersburg
Decembrists